Karthikeyan (in short Karthikeya, Karthik, Kartik) is an Indian masculine given name derived from the Lord Kartikeya.

People 
 D. R. Karthikeyan, an Indian Police Service Officer.
 G. Karthikeyan, an Indian politician and the speaker of the Kerala Legislative Assembly
 M. L. R. Karthikeyan, an Indian playback singer
 Murali Karthikeyan, an Indian chess Grandmaster
 Narain Karthikeyan, the first Formula One motor racing driver from India
 P. S. Karthikeyan, an Indian politician who was a member of the Kerala Legislative Assembly
 Sivakarthikeyan, an Indian film actor, television anchor, and stand-up comedian of Tamil Nadu

See also
 Karthik (disambiguation)
 Karthika (disambiguation)
 Kartik (month)

Hindu given names
Indian masculine given names